Fonterra Dairy Woman of the Year is an annual award presented by New Zealand dairy company Fonterra and not-for-profit organisation Dairy Women's Network to a woman who has made an outstanding contribution to the dairy industry. The selection panel is made up of five judges including representatives from Dairy Women’s Network, Fonterra, Global Women, Ballance Agri-Nutrients and a previous recipient of the award.

Recipients

See also

 List of awards honoring women

References

New Zealand awards
Awards honoring women
Awards established in 2012
2012 establishments in New Zealand